Arguvan is a district of Malatya Province of Turkey. The mayor is Mehmet Kızıldaş (CHP).

Demographics 
The majority of the district is Alevi from both Kurdish and Turkish ethnicity. The Kurdish Atman tribe reside in ten villages and hamlets in the district. Other Kurdish tribes include the Direjan, Kurecik, and the Parçikan.

Settlements

Notable people 

 İlyas Salman
 Kemal Bülbül

References

Populated places in Malatya Province
Districts of Malatya Province
Kurdish settlements in Turkey